Basford is a ghost town in Burt County, Nebraska, United States.

History
A post office was established at Basford in 1895, and remained in operation until it was discontinued in 1901. The town was likely named after Basford, in England.

References

Geography of Burt County, Nebraska